NA-190 Jacobabad is a constituency for the National Assembly of Pakistan.

Members of Parliament

2018-2023: NA-196 Jacobabad

Election 2002 

General elections were held on 10 Oct 2002. Aijaz Hussain Jakhrani of PPP won by 40,147 votes.

Election 2008 

General elections were held on 18 Feb 2008. Aijaz Hussain Jakhrani of PPP won by 52,819 votes.

Election 2013 

General elections were held on 11 May 2013. Aijaz Hussain Jakhrani of PPP won by 51,025 votes and became the  member of National Assembly.

Election 2018 

General elections were held on 25 July 2018.

See also
NA-189 Rajanpur
NA-191 Kashmore

References

External links 
Election result's official website

NA-208